Hoje Macau (Today Macau), formerly called Macau Hoje, is a Portuguese-language newspaper published daily in Macau, established on 2 July 1990.

Hoje Macau is one of the few Portuguese-language newspapers left in Macau.

References

Newspapers published in Macau
1990 establishments in Macau